Reindorp is a surname. Notable people with the surname include:

David Reindorp (born 1952), British Anglican priest
George Reindorp (1911–1990), British Anglican bishop

Surnames of German origin